Conservatoires UK, also known as CUK, is a group that represents eleven British conservatoires.

Members

UCAS Conservatoires

In conjunction with UCAS, Conservatoires UK runs a clearing house for undergraduate and postgraduate music courses at seven of its member institutions called UCAS Conservatoires (formally CUKAS). Only the Guildhall School of Music and Drama does not accept applications through this system. UCAS Conservatoires allows applicants to submit one online application when applying to conservatoires, rather than a separate application for each institution (as was previously the case).

Principal's Group
The principal's group is the decision-making body of CUK and are the board of directors of the company. Meeting regularly, the head of institution (usually titled 'principal') represents the constituent members and is led by a chair, deputy chair and lead.

Student Network
The Conservatories UK Student Network is a sub-group of CUK and a representative body in itself of students studying at all member institutions. Formed in 2013, the group is made up of the elected students’ union presidents and student representatives of the member institutions, led by an elected chair. CUKSN works with the principal's group and external professional organisations to represent the views of students on their conservatoire education and experience.

CUK Big Band

The CUK Big Band is an ensemble of young musicians from music colleges across the UK. The group has performed three times in Leeds College of Music's 'The Venue' as part of the Leeds International Jazz Conference and in 2008 performed at the annual International Association for Jazz Education Conference (IAJE) in Toronto. The band is Directed by Mark Donlon and has performed world premieres of works by leading jazz composers such as Issie Barratt, Matt Bourne, Kenny Wheeler, Mark Donlon, Julian Joseph, Bob Mintzer, Mike Gibbs and Tim Garland. Compositions are commissioned through the PRSF funded Creative Exchange project, which also funds an annual Creative Exchange Student Composer Award.

References

External links
 ConservatoiresUK (CUK) Website
 CUK Big Band Review - Guardian
 UCAS Conservatoires

Higher education organisations based in the United Kingdom
Music schools in the United Kingdom